Robert-Jean Gustave Longuet, (9 December 1901 – 19 March 1987) was a French lawyer, journalist and militant socialist. He was the son of Jean Longuet, and the great-grandson of Karl Marx.

He notably rejected many overtures by Communists to whom it is said he often replied "No. You have falsified my great-grandfather." He was a supporter of Charles De Gaulle during the Second World War.

Biography 
From 1924–1926, Lonquet was the editor of Le Quotidien and later became the editorial secretary of the Nouvelle revue socialiste in 1926.

After a trip to Morocco in 1926 and in 1927, his work as a lawyer led him to defend anti-imperialist activists. Longuet founded in the magazine Maghreb in 1932 which existed until 1935. Before the start of the Second World War, he emigrated to the United States and lived there for five years.

After the conclusion of the war, Longuet worked primarily as a journalist. He was the Washington correspondent of the communist daily Tonight, and additionally the editor of the newspaper Libération Emmanuel d'Astier La Vigerie.

He also travelled to Africa, Morocco in particular, and Eastern Europe. During the Algerian War he defended National Liberation Front activists as well as the activists at the Grand Mosque of Paris.

In August 1979 he cooperated with Czechoslovak communist secret police on demonstration supporting the invasion of Warsaw pact armies to Czechoslovakia in August 1968.

Lonquet died in Paris on 19 March 1987.

Bibliography 
 La Profession d’avocat, 1932
 Colonialisme et civilisation, 1934
 La Question coloniale, 1936
 Karl Marx, mon grand-père, Stock, 1977
 Au cœur de l’Europe, le "printemps" ou "l’automne" de Prague, Coopérative ouvrière de presse et d’éditions, Luxembourg, 1978, Préface by Jeannette Vermeersch

Sources 
 Dictionnaire biographique du mouvement ouvrier français, tome 35 (fr)
 Georges Oved, La Gauche française et le nationalisme marocain, 1905-1955, L’Harmattan, 1984 (fr)

References

External links

1901 births
1987 deaths
20th-century French lawyers
20th-century French journalists
Burials at Père Lachaise Cemetery
French people of German-Jewish descent
French Section of the Workers' International politicians